Ban Khok Ma station is a railway station located in Bang Son Subdistrict, Pathio District, Chumphon.

Train services 
 Ordinary 254/255 Lang Suan-Thon Buri-Lang Suan

References 
 
 

Railway stations in Thailand